Griffon/GRSE 8000 TD class is a series of  hovercraft designed by Griffon Hovercraft Ltd, Southampton, England. It has proven to be one of Griffon's most commercially successful hovercraft.

The 8000TD's most extensive customer has been the Indian Coast Guard, for which the order was jointly built by the Griffon Hoverwork and the Indian firm Garden Reach Shipbuilders & Engineers. It has primarily been operated by military customers, including the Korea Coast Guard and the Saudi Arabian Border Guards.

Design
The Griffon Hoverwork 8000TD is a twin-engine fully-amphibious hovercraft. In Indian service, it has been typically operated by a complement of 11 personnel, which includes a pair of officers. In a typical all-passenger configuration, between 42 and 56 personnel can be carried.

Power is provided by a pair of  radiator-cooled Iveco diesel engines, supplied by the German engine manufacturer MTU, which drive the craft's  variable-pitch propellers. In order to minimise maintenance requirements and increase durability, many of the craft feature a touchscreen-based condition monitoring system that warns the crew of excessive vibration and other unfavourable conditions in and around the drivetrain in real-time.

The hull of the 8000TD is primarily composed of lightweight marine grade aluminium alloy, while other elements comprise a high proportion of composite materials, which are typically molded for greater strength and longevity. According to Griffon Hoverwork, each craft has an anticipated typical lifespan of 20 years with proper and regular servicing. It is fitted with a  skirt which has been designed to deliver consistence and safe performance over various terrain and weather conditions. Later-built craft feature improved seakeeping capabilities and a higher top speed, along with greater clearance, and more advanced onboard navigation and surveillance systems. For military operators, the craft has also typically been fitted with a single  machine gun, which can be equipped to be remotely operated. Some operators have opted to fit their 8000TDs with bow ramps, enabling road vehicles to be readily embarked and disembarked as required.

Operational history
During 2001, it was announced that the Indian Coast Guard had formed an agreement with Griffon Hoverwork to supply an initial batch of six 8000TD hovercraft, two of which were to be manufactured at GHL's own boatyard in Southampton, England, while the remaining four craft were assembled from complete knocked-down kits (CKDs) supplied to the Indian company Garden Reach Shipbuilders & Engineers (GRSE), based in Kolkata, India.

During October 2010, Griffon Hoverwork was awarded a follow-on contract valued at £34 million to supply the Indian Coast Guard with a further 12 8000TD hovercraft. At the time, this deal was the largest to ever be made by the company. These craft are not identical to the earlier batch, featuring several enhancements and additional pieces of equipment, often intended to improve serviceability and incorporate technical advances. This order was fulfilled almost half a year ahead of schedule, the final craft being delivered at a ceremony held in Mumbai on 5 September 2014. The Indian Coast Guard has deployed its 8000TDs in various roles, including search and rescue operations, to assist vessels in various forms of distress, as well as the surveillance and interception of offending vessels under both day and night conditions.

Additional operators for the 8000TD series have included three examples supplied to the Korea Coast Guard, five craft for the Saudi Arabian Border Guards, and a single example bought for use at Singapore's Changi Airport.

Ships of the class

Specifications
 Crew: 15
 Empty weight: 30,000 kg
 Payload: 8,000 kg
 Length: 22.52 m
 Height: 5.52 m
 Beam: 11 m
 Maximum speed: 50 knots or 92 km/h
 Armament: 1 x 12.7 mm machine gun
 Power: 2 × MTU 12V183 TB32 diesel engines  
 Propulsion: 2 × ducted CP aircrew propellers, 1,600 bhp
 Range: 365/42 
 Fuel capacity: 2,000 litres

See also
 Jija Bai class patrol vessel
 Tara Bai class patrol vessel
 Priyadarshini class patrol vessel
 Sarojini Naidu class Extra-fast patrol vessel

References

External links
Order 
Specification
H-181 commissioned
H-182 and H-183 commissioned
H-184 AND H-185 Delivered to ICG
H-186 commissioned
12 hovercraft ordered
H-187 commissioned
H-187 commissioned
H-189 commissioned
H-190 commissioned
H-191 commissioned
H-193 commissioned
Ships of the Indian Coast Guard
Hovercraft